Our Top Ten Treasures was a 2003 special episode of the BBC Television series Meet the Ancestors which profiled the ten most important treasures unearthed in Britain, as voted for by a panel of experts from the British Museum.

Production
The programme was commissioned for broadcast on New Year’s Day 2003 to tie in with an exhibition at the British Museum as part of new director Neil MacGregor's attempts to popularise the museum.

Following the broadcast viewers were invited to vote for their favourites in a poll that was won by the Vindolanda Tablets, with the Sutton Hoo ship burial in second place.

Reception
Richard Morrison writing in The Times criticised the British Museum for co-operating in an, "unashamedly populist television archaeology venture," and another article in the same title stated, "You may not like the idea of a league table of treasures that pits one priceless object against another, but television has its own logic."

Synopsis

Hart-Davis presents the top ten treasures as voted by the expert panel in reverse order.

Contributors

See also
 A History of the World in 100 Objects
 Britain's Secret Treasures

References

BBC television documentaries about history
Documentary films about the visual arts
British Museum
British Museum in media
Prehistory and Europe objects in the British Museum